Badlani is a surname. Notable people with the surname include:

Priya Badlani (born 1985), Indian actress and former model

Surnames